The Canadian Militia is  a historical title for military units raised for the defence of Canada. The term has been used to describe sedentary militia units raised from local communities in Canada; as well as the regular army for the Province of Canada and post-confederated Canada, referred to as the active militias.

The earliest militia units in Canada dates back to 16th century in New France. In the French colony, a compulsory militia of settlers from every parish was raised in order to support the military of New France in the defence and expansion of the colony. Sedentary militia units were also raised by the British, to defend its colonies and to support British military operations on the continent. Enrolment in the sedentary militias occurred in Canada until 1873.

The Canadian Militia also referred to the regular army established by the Province of Canada under the Militia Act of 1855. The two organizations that originated from the act, the Permanent Active Militia (PAM), and the Non-Permanent Active Militia (NPAM), continued to serve as Canada's regular army following Canadian Confederation in 1867. In November 1940, both PAM and NPAM were reorganized as the Canadian Army, with PAM becoming the Army's Regular Force, and NPAM becoming the Army Reserve. The Army Reserve continues to be informally referred to as the militia in Canada.

Sedentary militias

Enrolment in a local sedentary unit was required in the French colony of New France, and the various colonies of British North America; with these sedentary militia units occasionally conducting drills and training exercises, as well as participating in an annual reviews.

Prior to Canadian Confederation, the Province of Canada, and the colonies of Atlantic Canada maintained their own militias. Enrolment in the sedentary militias continued for several years after Canadian Confederation, although the practice was ended shortly afterwards, superseded by the active militias. 
The colonies of British Columbia and Vancouver Island did not require its residents to enrol with a sedentary militia unit, although locally raised "volunteer corps" were established.

New France

Use of militias in Canada date back to New France. As the militias in New France were formally maintained by the Intendant of New France, the system became a basis for centralized administration in the colony. Local militia captains were appointed by the intendant, and typically assisted the civil administration with road-building, and periodic censuses.

In 1669, King Louis XIV, concerned about the colony's inability to defend itself adequately against raids, ordered the creation of a compulsory militia that would include every fit male between 16 and 60 years of age. They were organized into companies, usually one per church parish, and structured in the same way as a regular French infantry company. The men were noted as excellent shots (most came with their own rifle, powder and bullets), and in better physical condition than regulars, because of their tough life, farming, fishing and hunting. Volunteer militiamen were used to support the regulars and their First Nation allies on lengthy raids, where they absorbed the skirmishing tactics of the latter. However, little time was spent on conventional European drill.

British-rule and post-Confederation
Following the British conquest of New France, local militia units continued to be raised, and support British soldiers stationed in British America/British North America. Members of the militia of the Province of Quebec first saw service with the British during Pontiac's War, when a battalion of three hundred  volunteers took part in Brigadier-General John Bradstreet's expedition to Detroit. The battalion was led by former members of the New French . British authorities also mustered the militia in Quebec during the American Revolutionary War, whose members constituted most of the defenders at the Battle of Quebec. However,  militias saw little expeditionary action during the American Revolution, with Frederick Haldimand, the Governor of Quebec, uncertain if the  militias would remain loyal should they encounter the French Royal Army.

While British North American colonies were expected to maintain a colonial militia, the militias were financed by the British government. Given the British government's preoccupation with Napoleonic France in the early 19th century, militias in the Canadas saw a shortage of supplies and weapons with limited funds provided for the militias during that period. In 1811, the militia strength of Upper Canada was approximately 11,000, although Isaac Brock, the Lieutenant Governor of Upper Canada, estimated that only 4,000 could be reliably expected to answer roll call. Early in his tenure as Lieutenant Governor, Brock passed legislation that allowed for him to train 2,000 volunteers, or men chosen by ballot, to serve as the flank companies for the Upper Canadian militia. During the War of 1812, British authorities raised a number of Canadian military and militia units to support the British in defending the Canadas.

In 1840, the sedentary militias of the Canadas was made up of 426 battalions, with 235,000 men registered on militia rolls. Sedentary militia were also present in Maritime colonies, with 40,997 reported in Nova Scotia's militia, while the New Brunswick militia reported 27,532 members in 1845. Prince Edward Island fielded a militia of approximately 8,000 men in 1845. During the Trent Affair in 1861, Nova Scotia revived compulsory militia service, enrolling 59,379 men in the Nova Scotia militia, of which 45,600 were armed.

Sedentary militias were later designated as the Reserve Militia, after the Active Militia were created in 1855. The Militia Act of 1868 extended the Reserve Militia system of the former Province of Canada to the newly formed Canadian dominion. In 1869, the Minister of Militia and Defence, George-Étienne Cartier, reported that 618,896 men were enrolled with the Reserve Militia. Enrolment for the sedentary Reserve Militia last occurred in 1873, although its theoretical practice was not abolished until 1950.

Active militias

As the British withdrew soldiers from British North America in the decades following the War of 1812, pressure fell on the Parliament of the Province of Canada to provide for its own defence. The Militia Act of 1855 was passed after a commission on militia reform suggested the sedentary force be supplanted with uniformed volunteer regiments. The resulting act led to the creation of the Active Militia, in an effort to bolster the colony's defences.

The Active Militia was later split into the Permanent Active Militia (PAM), the forces' standing army; and the Non-Permanent Active Militia (NPAM), a force that acted as a military reserve force. Members of the Active Militia were mobilized during the Fenian raids of 1866.

Post-Confederation militia

Following Canadian Confederation in July 1867, both PAM, and NPAM were managed by the Canadian Minister of Militia. The Militia Act of 1868 formally extended the Active Militias system of the former Province of Canada to the newly formed Canadian dominion. In 1869, George-Étienne Cartier reported that 37,170 volunteers were enrolled with the Active Militias. However, funding remained an issue for the militia in the 1870s and 1880s, with British officers urging the Canadian government to either increase the militia's funding, or reduce militia enrolments until its units can be sufficiently trained and equipped.

The Active Militias were mobilized on a number of occasions in the latter half of the 19th century, including the Fenian raids of 1870–71, the Wolseley expedition, the North-West Rebellion, and the Second Boer War. The Second Boer War saw more than 8,000 volunteers raised for service in South Africa, from 82 different militia units. 
 
From 1875 to 1904, the officer heading the Canadian Militia was the General Officer Commanding the Canadian Militia (GOC), a position legally required to be held by an officer of the British Army. However, serious differences in opinion over divisions of responsibilities between the civil and military branches of the Militia Department would see the post virtually abolished under the Militia Act of 1904. The office of the GOC was replaced by the Militia Council. The six member council included the Minister of Militia serving as the council's president, another civilian member, typically the Deputy Minister of Militia, and four members drawn from the Canadian military, the Chief of General Staff, the Adjutant General, the Quartermaster General, and the Master General of the Ordnance. Although modelled after the British Army Council, the Militia Council was purely an advisory body, with the Minister holding supreme authority over it; and the Chief of General Staff becoming the premier military member of the council.

The militia also saw several administrative reforms instituted in the early 1900s, with the establishment of the Canadian Army Service Corps in 1901; the Canadian Military Engineers, the Ordnance Stores Corps, and the Signalling Corps in 1903; and the Permanent Active Militia Medical Corps in 1904.

World Wars and Interwar period

During World War I, the militia was not mobilized, with Canadians serving overseas enlisting with the Canadian Expeditionary Force (CEF), a separate military field force managed by the Ministry of Overseas Military Forces. As World War I drew to a close and the CEF expected to disband, the Otter Commission was launched in an effort to reorganize the Canadian militia. The Commission proposed that PAM field a force of six infantry divisions, one cavalry division, supplemented by personnel from NPAM. Additionally, the Otter Commission saw links of perpetuation created between CEF and Canadian Militia units; permitting militia units to perpetuate the battle honours earned by CEF units disbanded after the First World War.

Improvements to both PAM's and NPAM's officer corps were undertaken in the 1930s, with PAM officers directing officer cadets through courses such as the "Advanced Militia Staff Course," beginning in 1935. As a result, the Militia fielded a much larger officer corps in 1939, when compared to 1914; with the Canadian Militia fielded approximately 5,000 officers spread throughout PAM and NPAM. However, training within the Canadian Militia remained an issue, with little regimental or larger formation training taking place during the interwar period.
 
In 1938, Ian Alistair Mackenzie, the Minister of National Defence, began to encourage General Harry Crerar, Chief of Defence Staff, to plan contingencies for the militia to prepare for expeditionary action, in the event of a war between Germany and the British Empire, without the consent of William Lyon Mackenzie King, the Prime Minister of Canada. Crerar sought to reorganize the Canadian Militia to new standards adopted by the British, mechanize the militia, and prepare PAM, and NPAM for combat in a temperate climate, which was the expected climate they would be operating in. However the General Staff's proposal to prepare a 60,000 man force to assist the British in the event of a war was not presented until 29 August 1939, days before the start of the war.

On the eve of World War II, the Canadian Militia's nominal strength was over 50,000 men, with PAM fielding 455 officers, and 3,714 soldiers of all other ranks; whereas NPAM fielded 5,272 officers, and 41,249 soldiers of all other ranks. However, the Canadian Militia was not prepared to undertake an overseas campaign at the outbreak of World War II. Colonel Charles Perry Stacey, a military historian for the Canadian Army from 1940 to 1959, on the readiness of the Canadian Militia at the eve of the Second World War,

Following the suggestion of General Harry Crerar, on 19 November 1940, the military land forces of Canada were renamed as the Canadian Army through an Order in Council. PAM was reorganized as Canadian Army (Active), whereas NPAM became Canadian Army (Reserve).

Legacy
The two Canadian Army components that were previously PAM and NPAM were renamed following World War II as Canadian Army Regular Force and Canadian Army Reserve Force respectively. However, in 1954, the Reserve Force was once again renamed Canadian Army (Militia) as a result of the Kennedy Report on the Reserve Army. Following the unification of the Canadian Armed Forces in 1968, the Canadian Army became Mobile Command, with its reserve component becoming Mobile Command (Reserve). In 1993, Mobile Command (Reserve) was renamed Land Force Command (Reserve), changing its name to match its Regular Force counterparts (also renamed Land Force Command). In 2011, the service elements of the Canadian Armed Forces reverted to their pre-1968 names, with Land Force Command (Reserve) reverting its name to the Canadian Army Reserve.

Since the unification of the armed forces in 1968, the term militia has not been used to formally describe a Canadian military force. However, the term is used colloquially in Canada in reference to the Canadian Army Reserve.

See also
 History of the Canadian Army
 List of regiments of cavalry of the Canadian Militia (1900–1920)
 Military history of Canada
 Mi'kmaw militia
 Military history of Nova Scotia
 Provincial Marine

References

Further reading
 
 
 
 

Military history of Canada

Regiments of Canada
Military units and formations established in 1920
Military units and formations disestablished in 1968
Militias